Josef Feistmantl (23 February 1939 – 10 March 2019) was an Austrian luger who competed from the mid-1950s to the early 1970s. He competed at three Olympic Games.

Biography

Feistmantl was born in Absam. Competing in two Winter Olympics, he won the gold medal in the men's doubles event at the 1964 Winter Olympics in Innsbruck along with Manfred Stengl.

Feistmantl also won five medals in the men's singles event at the FIL World Luge Championships with one gold (1969 - the first Worlds to be held on an artificial track, at Königssee), two silvers (1959, 1970), and two bronzes (1967, 1971). He also won two medals in the men's doubles event at the FIL European Luge Championships with one gold (1967) and one silver (1962). After his 1969 World Championship win, he donated the medal to the Polish team after their luger Stanisław Paczka had been killed whilst in competition at the Championships: Feistmantl stated that he "wanted to set a positive example". That year the International Olympic Committee awarded him a Fair Play Prize for his gesture.

At the opening ceremonies of the 1976 Winter Olympics, Feistmantl and fellow Austrian alpine skier Christl Haas were lighters of separate Olympic Flames as defined by Innsbruck's hosting of their second Winter Olympics. He subsequently cited this as his fondest memory.

Feistmantl was inducted into the International Luge Federation Hall of Fame in 2005 along with Hans Rinn.

References

External links

FIL-Luge.org March 14, 2005 article on the new FIL Hall of Fame, including Feistmantl's induction. - accessed 8 March 2008.

 

1939 births
2019 deaths
Austrian male lugers
Olympic lugers of Austria
Olympic gold medalists for Austria
Lugers at the 1964 Winter Olympics
Lugers at the 1968 Winter Olympics
Lugers at the 1972 Winter Olympics
Olympic medalists in luge
Medalists at the 1964 Winter Olympics
Olympic cauldron lighters